Dickinson is an American comedy-drama television series about Emily Dickinson, created by Alena Smith and produced for Apple TV+. Starring Hailee Steinfeld as Emily Dickinson, the series aired for 30 episodes over three seasons from November 1, 2019, to December 24, 2021.

Premise
Dickinson takes place "during Emily Dickinson's era with a modern sensibility and tone. It takes viewers into the world of Emily, audaciously exploring the constraints of society, gender, and family from the perspective of a budding writer who doesn't fit in to her own time through her imaginative point of view. Dickinson is Emily's coming-of-age story – one woman's fight to get her voice heard."

Cast and characters

Main
 Hailee Steinfeld as Emily Dickinson, an aspiring poet in love with her best friend Sue, who is also her brother's fiancée. She pushes back against her parents' attempts to find her a suitor.
 Adrian Blake Enscoe as Austin Dickinson, Emily and Lavinia's older brother, recently out of college. He is engaged to Sue Gilbert.
 Anna Baryshnikov as Lavinia "Vinnie" Dickinson, the youngest of the Dickinson siblings; she is upset that her parents are not attempting to find her a suitor. She has her eyes on Joseph Lyman. 
 Ella Hunt as Sue Gilbert, Emily's  lover and best friend who later marries Austin. She is recently orphaned and lived at a boarding house before moving in with Emily's family, until in later seasons builds the Evergreens, Austin and Sue's house.
 Jane Krakowski as Emily Norcross Dickinson, the mother of Emily, Austin, and Lavinia. She is a housewife with patriarchal views and is upset when her husband hires a maid. In later seasons, she begins to shift to more radical views.
 Toby Huss as Edward Dickinson, the father of Emily, Austin, and Lavinia who holds patriarchal views and disapproves of Emily's writing. He later runs for Congress and defects from the Whig party.
 Amanda Warren as Betty (season 3; recurring season 1; guest season 2), a local dressmaker and Henry's wife with whom she has a daughter.
 Chinaza Uche as Henry (season 3; recurring seasons 1–2), a writer and editor, hired hand of the Dickinson family, and in season 3 joins the U.S. Army with the goal of arming African American soldiers.

Recurring
 Wiz Khalifa as Death 
 Samuel Farnsworth as George Gould, a friend of Austin who is romantically interested in Emily
 Darlene Hunt as Maggie, a maid hired by Edward at the request of Emily
 Gus Birney as Jane Humphrey, the most popular girl in town
 Sophie Zucker as Abby Wood, one of Jane's minions
 Allegra Heart as Abiah Root, one of Jane's minions
 Kevin Yee as Toshiaki, a friend of Jane's
 Gus Halper as Joseph Lyman (season 1), the young man in whom Lavinia is interested
 Jason Mantzoukas as Bee (voice; season 1), one of Emily's hallucinations
 Robert Picardo as Ithamar Conkey, a townsperson who is a close friend of Mr. Dickinson, and attempts to fall in love with Aunt Lavinia.
 Matt Lauria as Ben Newton (season 1), a law clerk for Mr. Dickinson
 Jessica Hecht as Aunt Lavinia (seasons 1–2), Emily Norcross Dickinson's sister, and the world-traveling widowed aunt of Emily, Austin, and Lavinia
 Finn Jones as Samuel Bowles (season 2), the editor of the local paper, the Springfield Republican
 Pico Alexander as Henry Shipley (season 2), a new lodger at the Dickinson residence, and a former boyfriend of Lavinia's
 Will Pullen as Nobody, and as Frazar Stearns (seasons 2–3), a school friend of Austin's now enrolled at West Point, Emily has a vision of him dying and it comes true.
 Ayo Edebiri as Hattie (season 2), a Dickinson family maid and a spiritual medium
 Gabriel Ebert as Thomas Wentworth Higginson (season 3), an abolitionist activist and colonel in the Union's 1st South Carolina Volunteers, whom Emily writes to in seeking advice on her writing.

Notable guest stars
 John Mulaney as Henry David Thoreau (in "Alone, I cannot be", "I felt a Funeral, in my Brain")
 Zosia Mamet as Louisa May Alcott (in "There's a certain Slant of light", "This is My Letter to the World")
 Timothy Simons as Frederick Law Olmsted (in "The Daisy follows soft the Sun")
 Kelli Barrett as Adelaide May (in "Split the Lark")
 Nick Kroll as Edgar Allan Poe (in "I'm Nobody! Who are you?")
 Ziwe as Sojourner Truth (in "The Soul has Bandaged moments", "The Future never spoke")
 Billy Eichner as Walt Whitman (in "This is My Letter to the World")
 Chloe Fineman as Sylvia Plath (in "The Future never spoke")

Episodes

Season 1 (2019)

Season 2 (2021)

Season 3 (2021)

Production

Development
On May 30, 2018, it was announced that Apple had given the production a straight-to-series order. The series would be written by Alena Smith who was also set to executive produce alongside Paul Lee, David Gordon Green, Michael Sugar, Ashley Zalta, Alex Goldstone, and Darlene Hunt. Green was also expected to direct as well. Production companies involved with the series included  and Anonymous Content. In October 2019, The Hollywood Reporter reported Dickinson had been renewed for a second season. In October 2020, the series was renewed for a third season, ahead of the premiere of the second season. In September 2021, it was announced that the third season would be its last and would premiere on November 5, 2021.

Casting
Alongside the initial series announcement, it was confirmed that Hailee Steinfeld would star as Emily Dickinson. On August 29, 2018, it was announced that Jane Krakowski had been cast in a starring role. On September 26, 2018, it was announced that Toby Huss, Anna Baryshnikov, Ella Hunt and Adrian Enscoe had been cast as series regulars. On January 29, 2019, it was reported that Matt Lauria had joined the cast in a recurring capacity. In September 2019, it was announced Wiz Khalifa
and John Mulaney had joined the cast of the series. In December 2019, it was announced that Finn Jones and Pico Alexander had been cast in the series. Jones plays Samuel Bowles, a newspaper editor, while Alexander plays Henry "Ship" Shipley, a dropout and boarder of the Dickinson's. Actors Will Poulter and Joe Thomas were considered for the role of Bowles.

Filming
Principal photography for the series commenced on January 7, 2019, in Old Bethpage, New York. In March 2019, it was reported by The New York Times that filming had concluded. In November 2019, Steinfeld confirmed that filming for season two was underway and had been for several months. Filming for season three began on March 17, 2021 and concluded on June 15, 2021

Some scenes were filmed at Kaufman Astoria Studios in Queens, New York. Many scenes from  Season 3 were filmed at the Jay Estate in Rye, New York.

Reception

Season 1 
The first season of Dickinson received generally positive reviews. It holds an approval rating of 76% on Rotten Tomatoes based on 67 reviews, and an average rating of 6.5/10. The website's critical consensus reads, "Audacious and aspirational, Dickinsons bold blend of period-drama and millennial milieu definitely won't be for all, but those looking to break free from the doldrums of their viewing life may find some kind of hope in its singular vision." On Metacritic, which uses a weighted average, the first season has a score of 66 out of 100 based on 29 critics, indicating "generally favorable reviews".

Season 2 
The second season received universal acclaim. On Rotten Tomatoes, it holds a "Certified Fresh" 100% approval rating based on 26 reviews, with an average rating of 8.3/10. The website's critical consensus reads, "With stronger writing and a never-better Hailee Steinfeld, Dickinson finds surer footing in its second season without losing any of its strange delights." On Metacritic, the second season has a score of 81 out of 100 based on 9 critics, indicating "universal acclaim".

Season 3 
The third and final season also received universal acclaim. On Rotten Tomatoes, it holds a 100% approval rating based on 23 reviews, with an average rating of 8.3/10. The website's critical consensus reads, "Authentically itself to the very last, Dickinson'''s final season delivers elegant closure like a well-structured stanza." On Metacritic, the third season has a score of 91 out of 100 based on 6 critics, indicating "universal acclaim."

 Accolades Dickinson won a Peabody Award in the Entertainment category, making it the first show from Apple TV+ to win the prestigious honor.

 Audience viewership Dickinson'' broke through Parrot Analytics' top 10 most in-demand original streaming shows for the week of November 6, 2019 to November 12, 2019.

Notes

References

External links
  – official site

2019 American television series debuts
2010s American comedy-drama television series
2010s American LGBT-related comedy television series
2010s American LGBT-related drama television series
2020s American comedy-drama television series
2020s American LGBT-related comedy television series
2020s American LGBT-related drama television series
2021 American television series endings
American biographical series
Apple TV+ original programming
Bisexuality-related television series
Cultural depictions of Emily Dickinson
English-language television shows
Television series by Anonymous Content
Television series set in the 19th century